Bolossy Kiralfy (1848–1932), one of The Kiralfy Brothers, was a performer, producer, writer and creator of musical extravaganzas in the late 19th, early 20th centuries.  He was a "great international showman" and ushered in the "era of the Spectacle".  Bolossy Kiralfy, born January 31, 1847, in Pest—(since 1873 incorporated with Buda and Óbuda into Budapest)—and died March 6, 1932, in London, England.  Elise Marie Waldau, was his first wife which he married  approximately 1874 and divorced 1899.  His second wife, Helen (Nellie) Dawnay was married on November 23, 1899, in London, England.

Productions and engagements
1892 - Engaged by Palisades Amusement and Exhibition Company to serve as the General Manager and Amusement Director of the Eldorado Amusement Park in Weehawken, New Jersey. For this production, he traveled to Europe to engage artists.

Humpty Dumpty 

The pantomime musical broadway adaptation of nursery rhyme figure Humpty Dumpty debuted at the Olympic Theatre, (8/31/1871 - 6/11/1872), George L. Fox (clown), named stage manager in 1866, performed.

Siege of Troy
Siege of Troy Production : The Siege of Troy from the Trojan War performed.

References

Further reading
Bolossy Kiralfy, Creator of Great Musical Spectacles: An Autobiography. Edited by Barbara M. Barker. Theatre and dramatic studies, no. 50.  UMI Research Press (1988)

American theatre managers and producers
19th-century theatre
American amusement park businesspeople
1848 births
1942 deaths
19th-century American businesspeople